The 2013–14 Oklahoma State Cowgirls basketball team will represent Oklahoma State University in the 2013–14 college basketball season. It will be head coach Jim Littell's third season at Oklahoma State. The Cowgirls, were members of the Big 12 Conference and will play their home games at the Gallagher-Iba Arena. They finished the season with a 25–9 overall, 11–7 in Big 12 play for a tie to finish in third place. They lost in the semifinals in the 2014 Big 12 Conference women's basketball tournament to Baylor. They were invited to the 2014 NCAA Division I women's basketball tournament which they defeated Florida Gulf Coast in the first round, Purdue in the second round before losing to Notre Dame in the sweet sixteen.

Roster

Schedule and results
Sources:

|-
! colspan=9 style="background:#FF6600; color:#000000;"|Exhibition

|-
!colspan=9 style="background:#000000; color:#FF6600;"| Non-conference regular season

|-
!colspan=9 style="background:#000000; color:#FF6600;"|Conference Regular Season

|-
!colspan=12 style="background:#FF6600; color:#000000;"| Big 12 tournament

|-
!colspan=12 style="background:#FF6600; color:#000000;"| NCAA tournament

See also
2013–14 Oklahoma State Cowboys basketball team

References

Oklahoma State Cowgirls basketball seasons
Oklahoma State
Oklahoma State
2013 in sports in Oklahoma
2014 in sports in Oklahoma